Airwork is an aviation business based in Auckland, New Zealand. The Airwork Group is New Zealand's largest general aviation company. It focuses on fixed wing and helicopter maintenance, leasing, and operations working with private and public entities on aviation operations, with a fleet of helicopters and 737 freighters.

It operates freight services in Australia for Toll Priority and Pacific Air Express. It operates night postal services for New Zealand Post and Freightways through a joint venture agreement.  Its main fixed wing base is Auckland Airport, with helicopter operations at Ardmore Airport and Queenstown Airport in New Zealand. The Australian freighter fleet has its headquarters at Brisbane Airport, with operational bases in Perth, Adelaide, Melbourne, and Darwin.

History
The Airwork group is one of New Zealand's oldest aviation companies. Airwork was first established in 1936 by aircraft engineers Charles and Arthur (Bill) Brazier as an aircraft maintenance company originally assembling Tiger Moth biplanes at Rongatai Airfield. As the industry developed, Airwork moved into the engine overhaul business and in the 1970s became a listed company in which Brierley Investments built up a substantial shareholding. The business was purchased in 1984 by Hugh Jones and Alan Hubbard, and in 1988 Hugh Jones took control of the whole business.

Airwork Holdings Limited was listed on the New Zealand Stock Exchange (NZX) in 2013 with the code AWK at an IPO price of $2.60 per share. Airwork's profit has increased 52% in the year ending 30 June 2014. In October 2016, Chinese Zhejiang Rifa Holding Group offered $5.40 per share for 75 percent of the business. The offer closed in early March 2017 with 94.7 percent shareholder acceptance.  On 27 September 2017, Rifa Jair Company, a unit of Zhejian Rifa Holding group Co, made a full takeover offer for all fully paid ordinary shares of Airwork Holdings at a 21 percent premium to the closing price on 26 September 2017. 
In January 2020 Airwork began services across the Tasman with the start of Auckland to Sydney flying in conjunction with Fedex.

Fleet

As of January 2020 the Airwork fleet consists of the following aircraft:

In addition to the aircraft above, Airwork owns 29 Helicopters.

As at Jan 2020 the Airwork fleet consists of the following aircraft:

Incidents and accidents
On 26 November 1993, two aircraft operated by Airwork, under contract to the New Zealand Police, collided in mid-air over central Auckland. The collision of the Aérospatiale TwinStar helicopter and Piper Archer fixed wing aeroplane resulted in the deaths of all four occupants.
On 2 May 2005 a Fairchild SA227-AC Metro III registration ZK-POA broke up in flight 6 km East of Stratford. The flight was a NZ Post service from Auckland to Blenheim. The crash killed the two occupants.
 On 26 January 2014 a Boeing 737-300F ZK-TLC conducting a Toll freight service from Brisbane was involved in an incident while landing at Henderson field, Honiara in the Solomons Islands. The right landing gear collapsed during the roll out. None of the three crew were hurt in the incident.

References

External links

Airwork Group

Airlines of New Zealand
Airlines established in 1984
New Zealand companies established in 1984